Mashari Saleh Mohsen Al-Ballam (December 12, 1971 – February 25, 2021), was a Kuwaiti actor. He played many complex roles, such as the epileptic patient in the series Paths of Doubt, and the deaf mute in the series Jarrah Al-Zaman ( the wounded time series).

Education and career 
He held a diploma in industrial management from the "College of Business Studies" at the Public Authority for Applied Education and Training. He started his artistic work in 1991 when he participated in the Free Kuwait play, and after that his artistic works were in small and medium roles until he participated in the 1998 series Dart Al-Ayam and was able to achieve success, he later rolled out roles and took on bigger roles.

Al-Ballam participated in the reality TV program Al-Wadi, which was shown on the Lebanese Broadcasting Corporation channel in 2005, and won the title of "Valley Farmer" when he won the audience vote in the final episode on the artist Turki Al-Youssef from Saudi Arabia, the player Khaled Al-Ghandour from Egypt, and his compatriot, Zahra Al-Kharji.

Personal life 
He was married and has five children: Saleh, Maryam, Abdullah, Hamad and Sheikha. He is the cousin of actor Hassan Al-Ballam.

Death 
Al-Ballam died on Thursday, February 25, 2021, at the age of 49, after contracting COVID-19.

References

External links 
Mishari Al-Ballam on Elcinema

Kuwaiti actors
1971 births
2021 deaths
Deaths from the COVID-19 pandemic in Kuwait